Mantooth is a surname. Notable people with the surname include:

Randolph Mantooth (born 1945), an American actor
Donald Mantooth (born 1952), an American actor, brother of Randolph

Fictional characters
Wes Mantooth, a rival newscaster from the film Anchorman: The Legend of Ron Burgundy, portrayed by Vince Vaughn, and his mother Dorothy.